The chief of staff to the vice president of the United States is the chief of staff position within the Office of the Vice President, part of the Executive Office of the President of the United States. The chief of staff has been responsible for overseeing the actions of the vice president's staff, managing the vice president's schedule, and deciding who is allowed to meet with the vice president.

Chiefs of staff to the vice president

Popular culture 
Joshua Malina portrays Chief of Staff Will Bailey of Vice President Robert Russell in the fictional Bartlet Administration on the multiple Emmy Award–winning television drama The West Wing.
Anna Chlumsky portrays Chief of Staff Amy Brookheimer to Vice President Selina Meyer on the HBO series Veep, a role for which she has been nominated six times for the Primetime Emmy Award for Outstanding Supporting Actress in a Comedy Series.
Michael Kelly portrays Chief of Staff Doug Stamper in the Netflix drama series House of Cards.

See also
 White House Chief of Staff

References

Executive Office of the President of the United States
Vice presidency of the United States